RiverSculpture! are public art displays found along the Milwaukee Riverwalk in downtown Milwaukee, Wisconsin. Information kiosks stationed near each presentation offer self-guided walking tours of this annual outdoor exhibition.

Description 
Each year, new sculpture pieces are unveiled at the opening of RiverSplash!,  a three-day summer festival held annually along the Milwaukee River, until the festival's cancellation  prior to the 2010 festival. The 2009 exhibition featured 15 unique contemporary sculptures from various artists, which are positioned at locations between Wisconsin Avenue and Cherry Street.

 Limitation Series: Bowls by Paul Sebben, 1993
 Epiphanic Recurve Redux by Bilhenry Walker, 1995
 Laureate by Seymour Lipton, 1969
 Acqua Grylli by Beth Sahagian, 2001
 Pere Jacques Marquette restored by Tom Queoff, 1987
 Trigon by Allen Ditson, 1970
 Victoria by Jim Agard, 2001
 Round Ring by John Ready, 2009
 Dream with the Fishes for Aurora by Cork Marcheschi, 1998
 Gertie the Duck by Gwendolyn Gillen, 1997
 Octagonal Ring by John Ready, 2009
 Dancing Through Life by Schomer Lichtner, 2003
 Gertie Gets Her Ducks in a Row by Benjamin Rothschild, 2007
 You Rise Above The World by Richard Taylor, 1999
 The Manpower Sculpture Collection

History
In 1998, seven sculptors from Wisconsin were selected by a committee of educators, artists, business people and architects, to lend artworks for installation along the Milwaukee River. The first installment included: Stephen Feren's OK Ready for Zora, Narendra Patel's Cuculidae, Bilhenry Walker's Epiphanic Recurve Redux, John Richardson's Dura-Membrane, Claire Lieberman's Riversponge, Thomas Uebelherr's Bath Tub Madonna, and Peter Flanary's Island. An initial 30,000 brochures were printed to describe each piece and give locations to the various sculptures, which also included permanent sculptures by Seymour Lipton, Allen Ditson and Gwendolyn Gillen. The sculptures are intended to be on loan for one year, but the artists or owners of the artworks have allowed for longer displays, and a few are owned by the Milwaukee Riverwalk District which organizes the exhibit.

Since its first presentation, RiverSculpture! has displayed works by more than 75 sculptors, and includes 12 permanent sculptures. John Ready's River Gems Urban Jewelry Collection which was created from items of daily life was the featured installation of 2009. The entire multi-piece sculpture exhibit will be on display through October 2010.

References

External links 
 RiverSculpture! 2009

Outdoor sculptures in Milwaukee